"Slice Me Nice" is a song by German singer Fancy from his debut studio album, Get Your Kicks (1985).

Background 

Interviewed for the book Europe's Stars of '80s Dance Pop: 32 International Music Legends Discuss Their Careers, Segieth explained how the song came about:

Track listing and formats 

 German 7-inch single

A. "Slice Me Nice" – 4:20
B. "Come Inside" – 5:00

 German 12-inch maxi-single

A. "Slice Me Nice" – 5:20
B. "Come Inside" – 5:00

Charts

Weekly charts

Year-end charts

References

Bibliography

External links 

 

1984 songs
1984 singles
Fancy (singer) songs
Metronome Records singles
Song recordings produced by Fancy (singer)